Istana Bukit Serene is the royal palace and official residence of the Sultan of Johor, located in Johor Bahru, Malaysia. The palace faces the Straits of Johor and has a bird's eye view of Singapore, a former possession of the Sultanate.

From historical records, the palace was completed in 1933.

Overview 
Istana Bukit Serene (Serene Hill Palace) has a huge sprawling garden which is a common site for many royal gatherings and celebrations. The palace is well guarded by the Royal Johor Military Force (JMF), the Sultan's own private army.

Istana Bukit Serene has a tower measuring 35m in height and is among the famous tourist attractions in Johor Bahru. This historical building features unique carvings and is influenced by the Art Deco aesthetic.

History
Istana Bukit Serene was a gift from the Johor government to the late Sultan Ibrahim Sultan Abu Bakar in conjunction with the ruler’s 40th anniversary as the sultan of Johor.

Japanese Occupation (1942-1945)
Sultan Ibrahim became a personal friend of Tokugawa Yoshichika during the 1920s. Tokugawa was a scion of the Tokugawa clan, and his ancestors were military leaders (shōgun in Japanese) which ruled Japan from the 16th to the 19th centuries. When the Japanese invaded Malaya, Tokugawa accompanied General Yamashita Tomoyuki's troops and was warmly received by Sultan Ibrahim when they reached Johor Bahru at the end of January 1942.

Yamashita and his officers then stationed themselves at Istana Bukit Serene and the state secretariat building, Sultan Ibrahim Building to plan for the invasion of Singapore. From the palace, he had a splendid view of the positions of the Australian Army and Navy across the Straits of Johor. Yamashita used the palace tower as viewing point as it had a bird's eye view of Singapore.

Although advised by his top military personnel that the palace was an easy target, Yamashita was confident that the British Army would not attack Istana Bukit Serene because it was the pride and possession of the Sultan of Johor. Yamashita's prediction was correct as the British Army did not dare attack the palace.

Shortly before the Japanese surrendered in 1945, Sultan Ibrahim was expelled from his residence at Istana Bukit Serene and was forced to reside at Istana Pasir Pelangi, the crown prince's palace.

Historical Events

Historical events held at the Istana Bukit Serene are:
venue for the Sultan Ibrahim Sultan Iskandar’s investiture ceremony in conjunction with his 55th birthday in 2014.
Akad nikah (solemnization) ceremony of Tunku Mahkota Johor Tunku Ismail Sultan Ibrahim and his consort Che Puan Khaleeda Bustamam was held on 24 October 2014.

See also 
 Istana Besar
 Istana Pasir Pelangi
 Pasir Pelangi 
 The Temenggong family
 Monarchies of Malaysia

References

External links

 A palace in the sun, Fauziah Ismail, New Straits Times

1933 establishments in British Malaya
Buildings and structures in Johor Bahru
Official residences of Malaysian state leaders
Palaces in Johor
Royal residences in Malaysia